Som folk är mest is a 1944 Swedish comedy film directed by Hasse Ekman.

Plot summary
Kurre and Inga are engaged to be married, but their income is not sufficient for that just yet. Inga has no prospects of getting a raise, she has a hard time with the zealous office manager Enander. Inga has a liability to be late for work in the mornings and therefore get into trouble. The dictatorial Enander, to whom punctuality is more than a virtue, has had enough of it and is ready to burst out his anger at her. If only he can catch her being late...

To complicate matters further, one of Kurres colleagues, the sweet and flirtatious Miss Hansson, has started to court Kurre. All this will lead to misunderstandings and complications which are not so easy to solve. Will Kurre and Inga ever be able to get married?

Cast
Barbro Kollberg as Inga Larsson 
Karl-Arne Holmsten as Kurre Östberg
Stig Järrel as Enander
John Botvid as Karlsson
Tore Lindwall as Managing
Willy Peters as Fillebom 
Agneta Lagerfeldt as Miss Hansson 
Inga-Bodil Vetterlund as Kaj
Åke Engfeldt as Axel
Terje Valenkamph as Hugo, "Hugge"

External links

1944 films
Films directed by Hasse Ekman
1940s Swedish-language films
Swedish comedy films
1944 comedy films
Swedish black-and-white films
1940s Swedish films